Cyclophora acutaria is a moth in the  family Geometridae. It is found in Venezuela and Colombia.

References

Moths described in 1863
Cyclophora (moth)
Moths of South America